Michael Berrer was the defending champion; however, he lost to 6th seed Daniel Brands in the quarterfinals.
Bastian Knittel defeated Brands in the final, 7–6(4), 7–6(5).

Seeds

Draw

Finals

Top half

Bottom half

References
 Main Draw
 Qualifying Draw

Intersport Heilbronn Open - Singles
2011 Singles